Conringia is a genus of plants in the mustard family known commonly as hare's ear mustards. These herbs are native to Eurasia, although one species Conringia orientalis, is known on many continents as a common weed. The genus was named for the German philosopher Hermann Conring.

Species include:
Conringia austriaca
Conringia orientalis
Conringia perfoliata
Conringia persica
Conringia planisiliqua

References

External links 
 Jepson Manual Treatment
 USDA Plants Profile

Brassicaceae
Brassicaceae genera